cis-Muuroladiene synthase (EC 4.2.3.67, MxpSS1) is an enzyme with systematic name (2E,6E)-farnesyl-diphosphate diphosphate-lyase (cis-muuroladiene-forming). This enzyme catalyses the following chemical reactions

 (1) (2E,6E)-farnesyl diphosphate  cis-muurola-3,5-diene + diphosphate
 (2) (2E,6E)-farnesyl diphosphate  cis-muurola-4(14),5-diene + diphosphate

The recombinant enzyme from black peppermint produces a mixture of cis-muurola-3,5-diene and cis-muurola-4(14),5-diene.

References

External links 
 

EC 4.2.3